This is a list of former mosques in Greece.  It lists former mosques and places of worship for Muslims in Greece. It lists some but by no means all of the old historical mosques of Greece. The term former mosque in this list includes any Muslim mosque (building) or site used for Islamic Prayer (Salah) in Greece but is not so any longer. For currently open, functioning mosques in Greece see List of mosques in Greece.

Mosques have existed within the borders of modern Greece since the era of Emirate of Crete (824-961). But no mosques of the Emirate remain as they were torn down and remaining Muslims either killed, enslaved or converted to Christianity after the Byzantine reconquest of Crete (961). Therefore currently the oldest mosque in Greece and the entire Balkan peninsula is believed to be the Çelebi Sultan Mehmed Mosque, the first in Didymoteicho (Western Thrace) built between 1389-1402.

Most of the listed former mosques date from the late 14th century to the early 20th century, when various parts of modern Greece was at some point a part of the Ottoman Empire. Beyond the new mosques built during Ottoman period, several Christian churches throughout Greece were also converted to mosques over time upon conquest, like the church of Hagios Demetrios in Thessalonica. Those were gradually converted back to churches following Greece's independence and annexation of other regions.

Many Ottoman mosques and the other Muslim monuments, especially in southern Greece, were either destroyed during the Greek War of Independence in the 1820s and successive wars and conflicts. During periods of nationalist uprising and wars against the Ottoman and later the Turkish army, the newly independent Greek nation showed little respect for the monuments of a faith identified with the enemy. A number of Ottoman mosques were confiscated and repurposed for use as government offices, churches, and other civilian purposes.

Many more mosques in Greece were closed or abandoned due to the 1923 Population exchange between Greece and Turkey. As a result, 355,000 to 400,000 Muslims left Greece, most of them forcibly made to leave their lands, livelihoods, and mosques.

Many former mosques and other religious buildings also survived in the provinces of Macedonia, Thrace, Crete, and the islands of the Dodecanese which were integrated into the Greek State in the early 20th century. By then there was already a law for the protection of religious buildings of all faiths.

The surviving former mosques or other religious structures are nowadays protected as monuments. A number of them are still used as government buildings and churches, while many others have been restored and used as museums, exhibition, and concerts centers and as tourist attractions.

Mosque buildings

List of former mosques in Attica and Central Greece 
List of former mosques in Attica that encompasses the entire metropolitan area of Athens, and the rest of the Central Greece which encompasses Attica.

List of former mosques in Central Macedonia 

List of former mosques in Central Macedonia administrative region.

List of former mosques in Crete 

List of former mosques in Crete, the largest and most populous of the Greek islands.

List of former mosques in Eastern Macedonia and Thrace 

List of former mosques in Eastern Macedonia and Thrace administrative region.

List of former mosques in Epirus 

List of former mosques in Epirus (region) in northwestern Greece.

List of former mosques in the North and South Aegean 

List of former mosques located in the Aegean Islands, the group of islands in the Aegean Sea between mainland Greece and Turkey, split between the North Aegean and South Aegean administrative regions.

List of former mosques in Thessaly 
List of former mosques in Thessaly administrative region near central Greece. The region was under the Ottoman controls for four and a half centuries, until 1881. As such many former mosques still remain intact.

List of former mosques in Western Greece and Peloponnese 

List of former mosques in Western Greece and Peloponnese administrative regions.

List of former mosques in Western Macedonia 

List of former mosques in Western Macedonia administrative region.

Formerly converted non-Islamic buildings 

List of former mosques in previously non-Islamic buildings, mostly churches, which have been converted back.

See also
 Greek Muslims
 Islam in Greece
 List of mosques in Greece
 List of the oldest mosques in the world

References

Sources 
 
 

 
Islam in Greece
Mosques in Europe
 
Ottoman Greece
Greek Muslims
Greece, former
Mosques in Greece
Mosques, former